Clubiona pallidula is a species of sac spider in the family Clubionidae. It is found in Europe, Caucasus, a range from Russia to Central Asia, and has been introduced into North America.

References

Further reading

External links

 

Clubionidae
Spiders described in 1757
Taxa named by Carl Alexander Clerck